Vine is an album by jazz saxophonist Chris Cheek. It was released by Fresh Sound New Talent.

Music and recording
The album was recorded at Avatar Studios, New York City, on December 20 and 21, 1999. Mehldau plays Fender Rhodes instead of piano on five of the eight tracks.

"So It Seems" has "winding melodies over a double-time feel and space-age chords that suggest club genres such as jungle and drum-n-bass."

Reception

The AllMusic reviewer believed  that Cheek's "sophistication as a writer takes a giant leap with Vine, his best album to date".

Track listing
"So It Seems" – 9:11
"The Wing Key" – 13:06
"Vine" – 6:39
"Ice Fall" – 7:57
"Granada" – 10:35
"Reno" – 7:33
"What's Left" – 8:56
"Not a Samba" – 9:31

Personnel
 Chris Cheek – tenor sax, soprano sax
 Brad Mehldau – piano, Fender Rhodes
 Kurt Rosenwinkel – guitar
 Matt Penman – bass
 Jorge Rossy – drums

References

1999 albums
Chris Cheek albums